Il popolo dei sogni is the third studio album by Italian singer-songwriter Dolcenera, released on 3 March 2006 via Amarena Music. The album peaked at number 16 on the Italian Albums Chart and it was certified platinum by the Federation of the Italian Music Industry.
It spawned the singles "Com'è straordinaria la vita" and "Piove (condizione dell'anima)".

Track listing

Other
The album sold nearly 60,000 copies.
The song "Il luminal d'immenso (L'ombra di lui)" is a cover of Radiohead's "A Wolf at the Door", from their album Hail to the Thief (2003).

Charts

Singles
"Com'è straordinaria la vita"
Released: March 2006
Writer: Dolcenera, Lorenzo Imerico, Roberto Pacco
Producer: Lucio Fabbri
Director: Giangi Magnoni
Chart positions: #5
"Piove (Condizione dell'anima)"
Released: September 2006
Writer: Dolcenera
Producer: Lucio Fabbri
Director: Francesco Fei
Chart positions: #18

References

2006 albums
Dolcenera albums
Italian-language albums
Edel Music albums